Moodie Island is one of Baffin Island's small, uninhabited, offshore islands and is a part of the Arctic Archipelago within the territory of Nunavut. Located on the southern side of Cumberland Sound, it separates Littlecote Channel to the west from Neptune Bay to the east.

The island is extremely mountainous with a highest point of roughly 765 m.

References

External links 
 Moodie Island in the Atlas of Canada - Toporama; Natural Resources Canada

Islands of Baffin Island
Islands of Cumberland Sound
Uninhabited islands of Qikiqtaaluk Region